This is a list of rivers in Guinea. This list is arranged  by drainage basin, with respective tributaries indented under each larger stream's name.

Atlantic Ocean

Sénégal River (Senegal)
Falémé River
Bafing River
Bakoy River
Kokoro River
Gambia River
Koulountou River
Geba River
Corubal River (Koliba River) (Tominé River)
Kogon River (Compony River)
Nunez River
Kitali River (Kapatchez River) (Katako River)
Pongo River
Fatala River
Konkouré River
Kakrima River
Soumba River (Dubréka River)
Soumbouya River
Morebaya River
Forécariah River
Mellacoree River
Kolenté River (Great Scarcies River)
Little Scarcies River
Mongo River
Moa River
Meli River
Mano River
Lofa River
Lawa River (Africa)
Saint Paul River
Nianda River
Saint John River
Cestos River
Cavalla River (Cavally River)
Sassandra River (Côte d'Ivoire)
Gouan River (Bafing River)
Férédougouba River (Bagbe River)
Niger River
Sankarani River
Ouassoulou River (Bale River)
Dion River
Gbanhala River
Fié River
Tinkisso River
Bouka River
Milo River
Baoulé River
Niandan River
Kouya River
Mafou River

See also 
 Geography of Guinea

References
Rand McNally, The New International Atlas, 1993.
 GEOnet Names Server

Guinea
Rivers